The Watchers are a race of fictional extraterrestrials appearing in American comic books published by Marvel Comics. They are commonly depicted as all-powerful beings who watch over the fictional multiverses and the stories that take place in them, and are not allowed to interact with other characters, though they have done so on several occasions, when the situation demanded it. Created by Stan Lee and Jack Kirby, the first Watcher to appear in the comics—named Uatu—debuted in Fantastic Four #13 (April 1963).

The Watchers have been featured in several forms of media outside of comics. In the Marvel Cinematic Universe (MCU), they first appeared in the film Guardians of the Galaxy Vol. 2 (2017); a Watcher (voiced by Jeffrey Wright) has a main role in the Disney+ series, What If...? (2021).

Fictional history
The Watchers are one of the oldest species in the multiverse and are committed to observing and compiling knowledge on all aspects of the universe. This policy of total non-interference came into existence due to a former, well-meant attempt by the Watchers to bestow advanced knowledge on the Prosilicans, who used the nuclear technology gained to create weapons and destroy themselves. When the Watchers returned to Prosilicus, the survivors blamed them for causing the catastrophe by giving the Prosilicans nuclear technology before they were ready for it. The Watchers then took a vow never to interfere with other civilizations.

Despite this, the Watcher Uatu has revealed himself to the superhero team the Fantastic Four, telling them of his race. In his first appearance, he made them battle the Red Ghost and his Super-Apes for control of the Moon. He complimented Reed Richards and claimed he would go to a more distant part of the galaxy to observe humanity. He aids them on several occasions against global threats such as the Molecule Man, Galactus, and the Overmind. The Leader discovered his existence and tracked him to his world. He transported the Hulk there to get the Ultimate Machine, which contains all the information in the Universe. The Hulk battled the Amphibious Qnax, who had also been sent to recover the machine. The Watcher transported them away from his machines to battle, and when the Hulk won, he transported Qnax back to his homeworld. He then took the Hulk back to his base, where the Hulk took the Machine despite the Watcher's warnings. The Leader transported him back to Earth and tried to use the device. However, the tremendous amount of knowledge proved too much for the Leader. He collapsed to the ground, unmoving, and the Hulk assumed that he died of shock. When the Hulk tried to use the machine himself, Uatu allowed him to hear the voice of Rick Jones, after which the Hulk removed the device. The Watcher then transported the Ultimate Machine back to his planet. After blatant interference with the mission of the Kree soldier Mar-Vell, Uatu is put on trial by his own race, but is released on the provision that he never directly interfere again.

Uatu is later banished by his race for aiding the Fantastic Four against the threat of his rogue nephew, Aron, the Renegade Watcher, who tries to destroy the universe. The Dreaming Celestial later scans Uatu and learns the Watcher has broken his pact of non-interference almost 400 times. The Celestial also reveals the Watchers, like the Celestials themselves, are servants of a concept called Fulcrum, with apparent consequences for interference. Despite this, the other Watchers have interfered in other civilizations' events, though rarely, notably when the world-ending robot Omegex approached the Milky Way and they deemed it dangerous enough to act directly against it.

There is also a tongue-in-cheek, splintered-off faction of Watchers that call themselves The Critics, who not only observe events, but also give dramatic critique as they take place. The only known Critic looks similar to other Watchers, but wears a mustache, goatee, dark sunglasses, and, rather than toga, dresses in a tweed sport coat.

When Nova briefly visits Uatu and witnesses him watching various alternate realities, he learns that Uatu's father was the Watcher who originally gave nuclear technology to the Prosilicans, with Uatu's search of parallel universes being motivated by the desire to find the one world where his father's act of charity was proved to be the right thing to do. Three of Uatu's brothers and sisters broke their non-interference vow by judging Nick Fury and fusing what's left of Uatu with Nick Fury making him a Human/Watcher hybrid that they chained to a rock.

When the Unseen summons Blink to him and tells her of things going on in the greater Multiverse, terrible creatures that are destroying time, space and dimension, and tells her that she is chosen by the device to act as protector of the very fabric of the Multiverse. This interference in the timestream causes a faction of Watchers to assault him with the objective of ending his involvement even if it means the end of the Multiverse.

The First Race
In the aftermath of the "Empyre" storyline, when the once pacifist plant-like aliens known as the Cotati were defeated after waging a war against Earth, the Kree and Skrulls, the Unseen uses his powers to inspect the weapons used by the Cotati, to find out that its from ancient technology that predates the Elders of the Universe, the Asgardians and even the Celestials. Once he realizes that it is from the ancient "First Race", the Unseen is overwhelmed with energy as a one-eyed Uatu is brought back to life. When the Unseen demands him to say something, all Uatu can say is "There shall be...a reckoning."

After using the Cyclopedia Universum to see everything that had happened during his absence including how Nick Fury became the Unseen, Uatu released Fury from his punishment and told him that the mysterious weapons used by the Cotati were indeed created using the Watchers technology. Uatu set out to prepare for an oncoming conflict, the return of "the First War", and enlisted Fury to act as his operative.

The First War
After Uatu realized that Watcher technology from "the First War" has spread all over the universe by a group called "The Reckoning", he summoned his brothers and sister to a meeting, as they included a clause in their sacred vow that it would be permissible to interfere should the Reckoning return. However, the Badoon were observing him and destroyed the moon, with Uatu and Fury on it. This ends up being the prelude of an invasion by the Badoon to Earth. As the moon's debris start raining down on Earth, the various Earth-based teams and heroes fight off the invasion and attempt to save the planet, while the Fantastic Four journey to space and find Fury, who reveals what's happening. This leads to Reed accessing the Cyclopedia Universum, which stores the knowledge of all the Watchers to learn more about the Reckoning and the Watchers themselves. 

As it turns out, there was a time when the rest of the Universe was still so young, and yet, one race already had advanced before all others. They could transform their own bodies into light and travel anywhere they wished in the blink of an eye and wherever they went, they soon began to be called the Luminous by the other species. They believed themselves to be kind and generous and therefore shared their gifts to other lesser and primitive civilizations. One of this civilizations were the Prosilicans that without the guidance of the Luminous, discovered other uses for the gifted technology that suited their own savage nature. While the mistake the Luminous made with the Prosilicans led the race to take their famous sacred vow to "only watch and never interfere with others" which is how they became the Watchers, the tale of the Prosilicans also goes far beyond the known fable. In truth, the Prosilicans had actually used the technology provided by the Luminous to wage war against every other civilization that existed at that times, leading to a final conflict that wiped out nine-tenths of the universe after an ultimate weapon was used. Due to the toxic fallout released by the weapon, the Luminous set up a barrier to prevent it from devastating what remained of the universe. The area affected by the fallout was eventually called the Barrens.

Powers and abilities
The Watchers are cosmic beings, who possess the innate ability to achieve virtually any effect desired, including augmenting personal attributes, time and space manipulation, molecular manipulation, energy projection, and a range of mental powers. They also have access to highly advanced technology.

Known Watchers
 Acba - A Watcher that was present during the universe's potential collapse.
 Aron – A renegade Watcher.
 Critics - A branch of the Watchers that comment on everything they observe.
 Ecce – The Watcher who first came upon the newborn Galactus. Despite realizing the danger of his existence, he chose not to eliminate him in his helpless state thereby contributing to his evolution into the Devourer of Worlds.
 Edda - A Watcher that was present during the universe's potential collapse.
 Egma - A Watcher that was present during the universe's potential collapse where he watched Quasar's fight with Maelstrom and his master Oblivion.
 Eihu - A Watcher who witnessed and affected the outcome of the battle between the Stranger and Overmind.
 Emnu - The leader of the Homeworld High Council who opposed the Prosilicus experiment.
 Engu - A Watcher who was present at the trial of Uatu.
 Eta - A female Watcher that lives on the floating island called Weirdworld.
 He Who Summons - The leader of the Watchers who engaged Exitar the Celestial.
 Ikor - The father of Uatu who proposed the Prosilicus experiment.
 Ing - A Watcher who was present at the trial of Uatu.
 Ocam - A Watcher who witnessed and affected the outcome of the battle between the Stranger and Overmind.
 The One - The repository of the Watchers' collective knowledge and observations throughout the eons. He was later killed by Exitar the Celestial.
 Otmu - A Watcher who operates in a sector of the Shi'ar galaxy.
 Qyre - A Watcher who discovered the recluses.
 Talmadge - A newborn Watcher.
 Ualu - A Watcher who was present when Quasar fought Otmu.
 Uatu – Originally assigned to Earth, Uatu was the first Watcher to break with his people's principles of non-interference by allying himself with the Fantastic Four against Galactus.
 Uilig - A Watcher on Earth-691 who was the survivor of the Hawk God's attack on the Watchers.
 Ulana – A female Watcher and Uatu's lover.
 Uravo – A young female Watcher who was sent to find Uatu when he had abandoned his post on Earth.
 Ute - A Watcher from Earth-374 who told the history of Proctor to the Avengers.
 Watcher of the Calishee – A Watcher who observed the planet Calishee.
 Xecu
 Zoma - A Watcher who was present at the trial of the recluses under She-Hulk.

Other versions

What If
The Watcher Uatu often observes how key events from the Earth-616 Marvel Universe differed in alternate universes and speculates on the related consequences.

Wha... Huh?
The Watcher appears as the host of Marvel Comics spoof.

Earth X
In the alternate reality of Earth X (Earth-9997), the Watchers are slaves of the Celestials. As punishment for their non-interference during the birth of their arch-enemy Galactus, the Celestials force the Watchers to observe the impregnation of newly formed planets with their Celestial eggs, and the eventual birth of the Celestial within, which ultimately destroys that planet.

Ultimate Marvel
In the Ultimate Marvel alternate universe limited series Ultimate Origins, the Watchers are depicted as machines that speak through a human host (Sue Storm). They choose Rick Jones as their "herald" to help humans survive an "upcoming crisis".

In other media

Television
 Uatu appears in the 1967 Fantastic Four series, voiced by Paul Frees.
 Uatu appeared in "The Incredible Hulk" segment of The Marvel Super Heroes.
 Uatu made a cameo appearance in X-Men: The Animated Series.
 Uatu appears in the 1994 Fantastic Four series, voiced by Alan Oppenheimer.
 The Watchers appear in Silver Surfer.
 Uatu appears in The Super Hero Squad Show, voiced by Dave Boat.

Marvel Cinematic Universe
The Watchers appear in media set in the Marvel Cinematic Universe (MCU):

 Three Watchers make a brief appearance in the live-action film Guardians of the Galaxy Vol. 2 (2017), with close-ups portrayed by Walt Linscott augmented by VFX. They meet with an informant (portrayed by Stan Lee), who tells the uninterested group about his experiences on Earth before leaving him. Director and screenwriter James Gunn has stated that the scene was created because of the online fan-theory that Lee's cameos throughout the franchise were due to his relation to the Watchers.
 A character inspired by Uatu and billed as the Watcher appears in the Disney+ animated series What If...? (2021–present), voiced by Jeffrey Wright.

Video games
Uatu appears in Marvel: Ultimate Alliance, voiced by Phil LaMarr.

Web series
The Watcher is the title of a web series that runs on Marvel's official YouTube page, hosted and written by Lorraine Cink, which features news about Marvel comics, film, television, and toys.

Music
The Watchers served as partial inspiration for the Genesis song, "Watcher of the Skies".

References

External links
 Watchers at Marvel Wiki
 Watchers at Comic Vine
 Watchers at Marvel Appendix

Characters created by Jack Kirby
Characters created by Stan Lee